Peace at Last may refer to:

Albums
 Peace at Last (The Blue Nile album), 1996
 Peace at Last, an album by Mark Read, 2009
 Peace at Last, an EP by Hem, 2007

Songs
 "Peace at Last", an instrumental by Ahmad Jamal from Ahmad Jamal '73, 1973
 "Peace, At Last", a song by Chaz Jankel from Chas Jankel, 1980
 "Peace at Last", a song by Radio Silence, 2011
 "Peace at Last", a song by Rick Wakeman from Lisztomania, 1975

Other uses
 Peace at Last, a 1980 children's book by Jill Murphy
 Peace at Last? The Impact of the Good Friday Agreement on Northern Ireland, a 2003 book edited by Jörg Neuheiser and Stefan Wolff
 Peace... at Last, an illustration by Rodney Matthews used as the cover art for the 1993 Magnum album Archive
 "Peace at Last", an episode of the History Channel miniseries The World Wars